Abdul Rahman bin Talib (1916–1968) was a former minister of Malaysia.

Elections result

Honours
 :
 Reception of the Malaysia Commemorative Medal (Silver) (P.P.M.) (1965)
 :
Recipient of the Meritorious Service Medal (P.J.K.) (1959)

References

Health ministers of Malaysia
Transport ministers of Malaysia
United Malays National Organisation politicians
Sultan Idris Education University alumni